Fellowship of the British Academy (post-nominal letters "FBA") is an award granted by the British Academy to leading academics for their distinction in the humanities and social sciences. The categories are:

 Fellows – scholars resident in the United Kingdom
 Corresponding Fellows – scholars resident overseas 
 Honorary Fellows – an honorary academic title (whereby the post-nominal letters "Hon FBA" are used)
 Deceased Fellows – Past Fellows of the British Academy

The award of fellowship is based on published work and fellows may use the post-nominal letters FBA. Examples of Fellows are Edward Rand, Mary Beard; Nicholas Stern, Baron Stern of Brentford; Michael Lobban; M. R. James; Friedrich Hayek; John Maynard Keynes; and Rowan Williams.

See also
 List of fellows of the British Academy

References

British Academy
 
British Academy